Acanthocalycium is a genus of cactus consisting of several species from Argentina. The taxon name comes from Greek akantha (meaning prickly) and kalyx (meaning buds), which refers to the spines on the floral tubes.

These plants are globose to elongate, with numerous ribs on the spiny stems. Flowers range from white to pink to red and open during the day.

Taxonomy 
Spinicalycium Fric (nom. inval.) has been brought into synonymy with this genus. Besides, the genus Acanthocalycium has been periodically included in the genus Echinopsis.

Species

References 

 Edward F. Anderson, The Cactus Family (Timber Press, 2001), pp. 105–106
 Willy Cullmann, Erich Götz & Gerhard Gröner, The Encyclopedia of Cacti (Alphabooks, 1086). pp. 124–125

 
Cacti of South America
Endemic flora of Argentina
Cactoideae genera